Kodurupaka is one of the oldest villages in the Karimnagar district of Telangana, India. It is 21 km from Karimnagar, on the highway from Karimnagar to Peddapalli. There is bus 
service to the town.

The actual place of interest is not exactly at the Kodurupaka Stage, but the entire village is concentrated deep inside, which is 2 km away from the main road.

Environment
Agriculture is the primary industry in this area and rice was the main crop. Drought is common in this area, so the farmers have largely switched over to cotton and maize. The village is located on the banks of the river which flows through Vemulawada. This was the major source of water for household consumption and for agricultural irrigation, but the river is running dry.

The village has much greenery. Palm trees provide a livelihood for many people, largely a group called the Gouds. Vegetables are much grown in this area also, and the Karimnagar RTC has dedicated a daily bus to collect the daily harvest at 4 am.

Also this village has different sunrise and sunset scenarios because it's surrounded by hills on 3 sides

References

Villages in Karimnagar district